Tarphyscelis is a genus of moths of the family Yponomeutidae.

Species
Tarphyscelis cirrhozona - Meyrick, 1921 
Tarphyscelis palaeota - Meyrick, 1913 

Yponomeutidae